Alpine skiing at the 2011 European Youth Winter Olympic Festival was held from 13 to 18 February 2011. It was held at the Alpine Skiing Venue Ještěd at Liberec, Czech Republic.

Results

Medal table

Men's events

Women's events

Mixed events

References 

Alpine skiing
2011 in alpine skiing
2011